Michael Xavier Charles Gidley (born 11 October 1976) is an Australian politician, and was the Liberal member for Mount Waverley in the Victorian Legislative Assembly from 2010 to 2018.

Career 
Gidley is an accountant and former Young Liberals president. He ran for Mount Waverley at the 2006 election, and also contested the safe Labor seat of Thomastown at the 1999 election.

Gidley is anti-abortion. In October 2014 he took part in the March for the Babies alongside Jan Kronberg.
in 2015 Gidley voted against banning anti abortion protesters from protesting outside abortion clinics.
Gidley is a supporter of the Monarchy.

Prior to gaining his party's nomination for the seat of Mount Waverley, Gidley had nominated for Liberal MP Kim Wells' seat of Scoresby.

Gidley opposed legalizing euthanasia.
Gidley lost his seat in the 2018 Victorian election and subsequently went on to join an Internet gambling firm.

Personal life 
Gidley was educated at Xavier College and he is married and has two children.

References

External links
 
 Parliamentary voting record of Michael Gidley at Victorian Parliament Tracker

1976 births
Living people
Members of the Victorian Legislative Assembly
Liberal Party of Australia members of the Parliament of Victoria
Australian monarchists
Deakin University alumni
Monash University alumni
People educated at Xavier College
21st-century Australian politicians